Karandighi is a village in Karandighi CD block in Islampur subdivision of Uttar Dinajpur district in the state of West Bengal, India.

Etymology
This area was part of the ancient kingdom of Anga and Karna, of Mahabharata fame, was closely associated with the area. The mythological associations are linked with the name Karandighi.

Geography

Location
Karandighi is located at 

In the map alongside, all places marked on the map are linked in the full screen version.

Police station
Karandighi police station under West Bengal police has jurisdiction over Karandighi CD block. It is 45 km from the district headquarters and covers an area of 388.42 km2.

CD block HQ
The headquarters of Karandighi CD block is at Karandighi village.

Demographics
As per the 2011 Census of India, Karandighi had a total population of 1,653, of which 844 (51%) were males and 809 (49%) were females. Population below 6 years was 234. The total number of literates in Karandighi was 813 (57.29% of the population over 6 years).

Transport
National Highway 12 (old number NH 34) passes through Karandighi.

Education
Karandighi High School was established in 1956.
KARANDIGHI KASTURBA GURLS HIGH SCHOOL ALSO THERE

Healthcare
Karandighi rural hospital at Karandighi (with 30 beds) is the main medical facility in Karandighi CD block.

References

Villages in Uttar Dinajpur district